Latika Katt (born 1948) is an Indian sculptor who specializes in stone carving, metal casting and bronze sculpting. She is notable for winning the Beijing Art Biennale Award for her bronze work titled "Makar Sankranti at Dashawmeth Ghat, Varanasi.

Life and career
Latika graduated from The Doon School, an all-boys school in Dehradun. She has admitted that being in the minority as a girl in an all-boys school gave her confidence and courage in her later years. She started attending the Baroda College of Art to pursue Bachelor's in Fine Art, Maharaja Sayajirao University of Baroda where she graduated with First Class honours in 1971. She was awarded a scholarship to research at the Slade School of Art, London University, London in 1981.

She first got great recognition in the 1970s for a body of experimental work made from cow dung as she did not have funds for anything else. Her talent was spotted by the politician and Prime Minister Indira Gandhi during an art exhibition, who later encouraged her to take sculpting as a profession.
She is a great admirer of Auguste Rodin and uses naturalism as her leitmotif. Her interest and association with nature was kindled by her father, a botanist. She taught at Jamia Millia Islamia and Banaras Hindu University for many years starting 1981 and is currently the Head of Department of Fine Arts at Jamia Millia Islamia. Claiming to sculpt real people, most of her subjects are her relatives, friends and students.

She lives and works from Delhi and Banaras.

Exhibitions

Some art exhibitions showcasing her works:

Paris Biennale, Museum of Modern Art, Paris.
‘STREE’ Show at Moscow, Leningrad & Tashkent.
The Self and The World: An Exhibition of Indian Women Artists at the National Gallery of Modern Art (NGMA) in Delhi.
Chemould Art Gallery and Woodstock Art Gallery, London.
Molten Landscapes at Cymroza Art Gallery, Mumbai.
Group Show at Gallerie Alternatives, Gurgaon.
“Heads”, Sakshi Gallery, Mumbai.

Solos: Art Heritage, MMB,& Kala Mela Lawns in New Delhi, Calcatta Art Gallery Kolkatta, Sculptures, Painting and Prints JAG CYAG,

Awards
Gujarat State Lalit Kala Academy, Ahmedabad, 1973.
All India Fine Arts and Crafts, 1974.
Society, New Delhi, 1975 and 1976.
Academy of Fine Arts, Calcutta, 1974.
Honoured as one of the Five Distinguished Women of Baroda, 1975.
International Women's Show at Artists Centre, Bombay, 1975.
A.P. Council of Artists, Hyderabad, 1976.
National Award, Lalit Kala Academy, New Delhi, 1980.

Scholarships 
 National Cultural Scholarships MSU, UGC New Delhi.
 International: British  Council Scholarship Slade School of Art ,London.

References

Further reading

External links
 Latika Katt's Profile
 Works of Latika Katt

1948 births
Living people
The Doon School alumni
Academic staff of Banaras Hindu University
Maharaja Sayajirao University of Baroda alumni
Indian contemporary sculptors
20th-century Indian sculptors
21st-century Indian sculptors
Indian installation artists
Punjabi people
Indian women sculptors
21st-century Indian women artists
20th-century Indian women artists
Artists from Uttar Pradesh
Women artists from Uttar Pradesh
Indian women contemporary artists